Shallow diving is an extreme sport, whereby enthusiasts attempt to dive from the greatest height into the shallowest depth of water, without sustaining injury. It is typically associated with traveling circuses along with the strongman, performing animals, clowns and other such attractions.

Technique
Divers aim to hit the water horizontally in a manner akin to the Belly flop. This spreads the impact over the greatest surface area, and achieves the longest time decelerating, before hitting the bottom of the container where the water is held.

World record
 Professor Splash (ne. Darren Taylor) successfully dove from  into a paddling pool of depth  breaking his record for a successive 20th time.
 Professor Powsey dove successfully from an 80-foot (24 m) tower into a tank with 4 feet (1.2 m) of water.
 Roy Fransen successfully dove from  into  of water.

References

High diving
Circus skills